The ethno-linguistic composition of Austria-Hungary according to the census of 31 December 1910 was as follows:

Population

Languages

In the Austrian Empire (Cisleithania), the census of 1911 recorded Umgangssprache, everyday language. Jews and those using German in offices often stated German as their Umgangssprache, even when having a different Muttersprache. The Istro-Romanians were counted as Romanians.

In the Kingdom of Hungary (Transleithania), the census was based primarily on mother tongue, 48.1% of the total population spoke Hungarian as their native language. Not counting autonomous Croatia-Slavonia, more than 54.4% of the inhabitants of the Kingdom of Hungary were native speakers of Hungarian. This included also the Jews (around 5% of the population), as mostly they were Hungarian-speaking (the Yiddish speakers were recorded as German).

Cisleithanian states

Transleithanian lands

Historical regions

The Germans in Croatia were mainly living in the eastern parts of the country where they had been settled along the Drava and Danube rivers, the Military Borders (Militärgrenze) after the ouster of the Turks in 1687.

Religions

See also
Demographics of the Kingdom of Hungary by county
Minority Treaties
Treaty of Saint-Germain-en-Laye (1919)
Treaty of Trianon (1920)

References 

 William R. Shepherd: "Distribution of Races in Austria-Hungary", Historical Atlas, 1911

Further reading
 Steidl, Annemarie et al. From a Multiethnic Empire to a Nation of Nations: Austro-Hungarian Migrants in the US, 1870–1940 (Innsbruck: Studien Verlag, 2017). 354 pp.

History of Austria-Hungary